The Statute of York was a 1322 Act of the Parliament of England that repealed the Ordinances of 1311 and prevented any similar provisions from being established. Academics argue over the actual impact of the bill, but general consensus is that it made the idea that the House of Commons should be consulted on all matters of general interest. The Statute is seen as "the end of a period of revolutionary experiments in English government", with no Ordinances ever attempted again.

Background

The Ordinances of 1311 were provisions imposed upon King Edward II by the peerage and clergy of the Kingdom of England to restrict the power of the king. Edward's victory against his political opposition at the Battle of Boroughbridge on 16 March 1322, and the execution of the Earl of Lancaster 6 days later, gave him a large amount of freedom, and Parliament was summoned to meet at York on 2 May 1322 with a writ backdated to 2 days before Boroughbridge. Edward's first matter was "the statute on the repeal of the ordinances", though with the proviso of "putting of the good points of the Ordinances into a statute". Draft copies discovered in the Public Record Office indicate that the Statute was originally only meant to repeal the Ordinances of 1311, with no additional provisions. The second draft, however, completely vindicated the idea of the royal prerogative, and prevented any similar Ordinances from being enacted, saying that "the Matters which are to be established for the Estate of our Lord the King and of his Heirs and for the Estate of the Realm and the People shall be treated accorded and established in Parliaments ... according as it hath been heretofore accustomed". As a result of the Statute, the Ordinances were repealed, and no attempt was ever made to reintroduce them; this has been seen as "the end of a period of revolutionary experiments in English government".

Constitutional implications

The House of Lords committee that discussed the Statute concluded that it meant to formalise what had previously been custom in regards to the rights of peers and the monarch, and that any previous statute made without regard for this was void. Henry Hallam concluded that, although seeming to advance the rights of the people by confirming previous custom (which included requiring the Monarch to consult the House of Commons when passing a Statute), the enactment "seems rather to limit than to enhance the supreme power of parliament, if it were meant to prohibit any future enactment of the kind by its sole authority", since the Lords Ordainers had been elected by the people; nonetheless, most historians believe it extended the Commons' rights. Those historians who do agree that it recognised the right of the Commons do not agree what it recognised; some say that it required the consent of the Commons when significant constitutional changes were to be made, some that it merely recognised the right of the Commons to be consulted in financial matters, and some that it recognised the right of the Commons to be consulted on all matters of general interest; the third theory is the most commonly accepted one. As stated, "the matters to be established for the estate of the king and of his heirs, and for the estate of the realm and of the people, should be treated, accorded, and established in parliament, by the king, and by the assent of the prelates, earls, and barons, and the commonalty of the realm, according as had been before accustomed"

Further remedies
While the Ordinances themselves had been repealed, many of the administrative points they had contained - regarding in particular sheriffs, the Statute of Merchants, and two grievances over legal appeals (Ordinances 17, 33, 35 and 36) - were taken over almost word for word in the new legislation, being known collectively as the six "Good Clauses".

Over time these clauses would later be repealed, eventually leaving just the introductory prohibition on such ordinances being made except by the king, Lords and Commons in parliament.

References

Bibliography

External links
 

Acts of the Parliament of England
Legal history of England
1320s in law
1322 in England